La Negra Tiene Tumbao (English: The Black Woman's Got Style) is the 59th album recorded by Cuban salsa recording artist Celia Cruz. It was released by Sony Music on 2 October 2001. It featured musical collaborations with Mikey Perfecto and Johnny Pacheco and was produced by Sergio George, Isidro Infante, Pacheco, Oscar Gomez, and Angel Carrasco.

Upon release, the album debuted at number five on the Billboard Latin Albums chart and number two on the Billboard Tropical Albums chart. It also managed to debut at number thirty-eight on the Billboard Heatseekers Albums. At the third Latin Grammy Awards, the album won Best Salsa Album and was nominated for Album of the Year. The lead single off the album and title track, "La Negra Tiene Tumbao", was nominated for Song of the Year, Record of the Year and Best Music Video. It featured two other singles, "Hay Que Empezar Otra Vez" and "Pa' Arriba No Va".

Recording and production
Producer Sergio George was hired to produce more traditional tracks for the album. However, George wanted to try something different. According to George, he played a demo version of "La Negra Tiene Tumbao" for Cruz, "not knowing how she would respond, and that was the song that she most reacted to". "La Negra Tiene Tumbao" was the last song completed for the album.

Release and promotion
The album was released on 2 October 2001 by Sony Discos. Sony Discos rereleased the album on 30 October 2001. On 23 July 2002, the album was rereleased with a bonus track remix of "La Negra Tiene Tumbao".

Musical composition
The lead single, first track, and title track, "La Negra Tiene Tumbao" combines elements of salsa music, reggae music and hip hop music. The song's title translates (from Cuban slang Spanish, as in music of Afro-Cuban origin, tumbao is the basic rhythm played on the bass) to "The Black Woman has Style" or "The Black Woman has Attitude". The song was composed in minor key and incorporates the use of vocal call and response.

Chart performance
After her 2002 tour of Europe, the album re-entered the Billboard Latin Albums chart at number thirty-seven for the week of 3 August 2002. It also reentered the Billboard Tropical Albums chart at number six.

Following Cruz's death in July 2003, La Negra Tiene Tumbao reentered the Billboard Latin Albums chart at number eight, for the week of 2 August 2003. It also reentered the Billboard Tropical Albums chart at number two, behind Cruz's own Hits Mix (2002).

Critical reception

Allmusic's Sharon Witmer awarded the album four out of five stars, providing a positive review of the album. She claimed the recording to have "mesmerzing" rhythms as well as "warm and zesty" music. Witmer complimented "La Negra Tiene Tumbao", calling it the "CD's biggest draw". She ended her review by stating "From start to finish, the CD swings, as the electrifying and indefatigable Celia Cruz proves once again that being young is a state of mind." According to Billboard magazine's Leila Cobo, "La Negra Tiene Tumbao", "with its mid-section rap became the blueprint—to this day—for a bust of recordings featuring much younger acts." The song has been considered one of Cruz's last hits before her death in July 2003.

The song received nominations for Record of the Year, Song of the Year, and Music Video of the Year at the Latin Grammy Awards of 2002. The parent album won the Latin Grammy Award for Best Salsa Album. It was nominated for Album of the Year. The album won the Lo Nuestro Award for Tropical Album of the Year at the 2003 Lo Nuestro Awards The song was also nominated Tropical Song of the Year, eventually losing to Cruz's own "La Vida Es Un Carnaval".  It received a nomination for Best "Party Starter" at the 2004 Premios Juventud. "La Vida Es Un Carnaval" was also nominated in the same category. In 2016, the song was awarded Television Theme Song of the Year, for the television program Celia, at the American Society of Composers, Authors and Publishers Awards.

Track listing

Notes
"La Negra Tiene Tumbao", "Pa' Arriba No Va", "Corazón de Rumba", "Qué Culpa Tengo Yo", "Mi Mercancía" and "Taita Bilongo" were produced by Sergio George.
"Hay Que Empezar Otra Vez" and "Sin Clave No Hay Son" were produced by Isidro Infante.
"Tararea Kumbayea" and "Déjenme Vivir" were produced by Johnny Pacheco.

Charts

Weekly charts

Year-end charts

Sales and certifications

References

2001 albums
Celia Cruz albums
Albums produced by Sergio George
Latin Grammy Award for Best Salsa Album
Spanish-language albums
Sony Discos albums